Mohamed Amine Aoudia (born June 6, 1987) is an Algerian professional footballer who plays as a forward.

Club career
Born in El Harrach, Algiers, Aoudia began his career in the junior ranks of IR Hussein Dey before joining CR Belouizdad in 2005 where he would spend the next three seasons.

Zamalek SC
On December 26, 2010, Aoudia agreed to join Egyptian club Zamalek SC on a three-year contract, with the club paying a transfer fee of $200,000 to JS Kabylie. On December 29, 2010, the deal was made official.

On January 21, 2011, Aoudia made his debut for Zamalek as a starter in an Egyptian Premier League game against El-Entag El-Harby, playing the full game which ended 0–0. A week later, Aoudia scored his first official goal for Zamalek in a 2011 CAF Champions League match against Ulinzi Stars of Kenya. Zamalek won 4–0 with Aoudia scoring the third goal of the game in the 76th minute. On May 21, 2011, Aoudia scored his first goal for Zamalek in the Egyptian Premier League in a 3–2 win over Arab Contractors SC. After coming on as a substitute in the 68th minute, with the score 1–1, Aoudia scored just three minutes later by heading a free kick from Shikabala into the net. On July 18, 2011, Zamalek's newly appointed coach, Hassan Shehata, deemed Aoudia surplus to requirements.

ES Sétif
On July 31, 2011, Aoudia signed a two-year contract with ES Sétif. The transfer fee was $175,000. In his first season with the club, he finished as the top scorer on the team with 12 league goals, helping the team win the league-cup double. The following season he was also the top scorer on the team that won the Algerian championship.

Dynamo Dresden
On July 4, 2013, Aoudia signed a two-year-contract with Dynamo Dresden which became effective on August 4, 2013.

USM Blida 
On September 14, 2020, Aoudia signed a one-year contract with USM Blida, joining them on a free transfer.

International career
Aoudia was a member of the Algeria under-23 national team at the 2007 All-Africa Games where he started all three games and scored two goals against Guinea and Zambia.

On September 27, 2010, Aoudia was called up to the Algeria A' national team for a ten-day training camp, including a pair of friendlies against Mali.

On October 30, 2010, Aoudia was called up to the Algerian national team by head coach Abdelhak Benchikha for a friendly against Luxembourg. He made his international senior debut in that game as a 75th-minute substitute for Karim Ziani.

Honours
ES Sétif
 Algerian Ligue Professionnelle 1: 2011–12, 2012–13
 Algerian Cup: 2011–12USM Alger'''
 Algerian Ligue Professionnelle 1: 2015-16

References

External links
 
 
 
 

1987 births
Living people
People from El Harrach
Kabyle people
Algerian footballers
Association football forwards
Algeria international footballers
Algeria under-23 international footballers
Algeria youth international footballers
2013 Africa Cup of Nations players
Algerian Ligue Professionnelle 1 players
Egyptian Premier League players
2. Bundesliga players
JS Kabylie players
CR Belouizdad players
USM Annaba players
Zamalek SC players
ES Sétif players
Dynamo Dresden players
FSV Frankfurt players
Algerian expatriate footballers
Algerian expatriate sportspeople in Egypt
Expatriate footballers in Egypt
Algerian expatriate sportspeople in Germany
Expatriate footballers in Germany
21st-century Algerian people